The San Diego Gulls were a professional ice hockey team in the West Coast Hockey League (WCHL) and later in the ECHL. The team, the third to use the Gulls nickname, was founded in 1995 immediately upon the departure of the IHL team of the same name. The Gulls played at the San Diego Sports Arena.

History
The Gulls were the dominant team throughout the WCHL's eight-year existence, winning the regular season championship five times. The Gulls never finished worse than second overall in WCHL league play, attaining the 100-point mark five times. The Gulls also won five of the league's Taylor Cup championships. No other WCHL team won the Taylor Cup more than once.

In 2003, the WCHL was absorbed by the ECHL, formerly known as the East Coast Hockey League. In 2004, the Gulls became the ECHL affiliate of the Colorado Avalanche. The Gulls won the ECHL regular season title in 2003–04 but missed the playoffs for the first and only time in their history the following year. In stark contrast to their WCHL playoff success, the Gulls failed to win a postseason series in three ECHL seasons.

Throughout their WCHL stint and through their first year of ECHL play, the Gulls were coached by St. Cloud State University (Minnesota) alumnus Steve Martinson. Martinson left the Gulls and went on to coach the Rockford IceHogs of the UHL. Martin St. Amour, who was a star for the Gulls in their WCHL years replaced Martinson as head coach prior to the 2004–05 season. St. Amour stepped down in the middle of the 2005–06 season and was replaced by former Gulls players Jamie Black and B.J. MacPherson as co-coaches. The final starting goalie was Kevin Lentz. He went 20-1-1 in the final stretch of the regular season but retired due to a knee injury.

2006 folding

On June 30, 2006, the Gulls folded and released their players as free agents following years of unprofitable seasons.

GULLS TO FORMALLY CEASE OPERATIONS FRIDAY – [ 06-29-2006] SAN DIEGO — The San Diego Gulls announced Thursday that they will formally cease operations as of Friday (June 30).  Ongoing negotiations to sell the club did not materialize in a timeframe sufficient to operate for the 2006–07 season.

Championships

Season-by-season record 
Note: GP = Games played, W = Wins, L = Losses, OTL = Overtime losses, SOL = Shootout losses, Pts = Points, GF = Goals for, GA = Goals against, PIM = Penalties in minutes

Final records.

Former San Diego Gulls players (WCHL) 

  Ralph Barahona
  Patrick Couture
  Ron Duguay
  Micki DuPont
  Rusty Fitzgerald
  Stefan Grogg
  Len Hachborn
  Trevor Koenig
  Marc Laforge
  Steve Martinson
  Sergejs Naumovs
  Mark Pederson
  Barry Potomski
  Pasi Schalin
  Daniel Shank
  Martin St. Amour
  Stephan St. Amour
  Garret Stroshein
  Dean Tiltgen
  Sergejs Višegorodcevs
  Tyler Weiman
  Mark Woolf
  Jarret Zukiwsky
 Aaron Galitzen
 Trevor Converse

References

External links
 San Diego Gulls seasons (West Coast Hockey League) (1995–2003)
 San Diego Gulls seasons (ECHL) (2003–2006)
  San Diego Magazine:  "Success Story on Ice" (2000)

1995 establishments in California
2006 disestablishments in California
Defunct ECHL teams
Defunct ice hockey teams in California
Ice hockey clubs established in 1995
Ice hockey clubs disestablished in 2006
Ice hockey teams in San Diego
West Coast Hockey League teams
Anaheim Ducks minor league affiliates
Colorado Avalanche minor league affiliates